Love, Now is a 2012 to 2013 Taiwanese modern romance comedy drama television series created and developed by SETTV. It stars Annie Chen and George Hu as the main leads, with Bobby Dou, Harry Chang from Taiwanese band Da Mouth and Vivi Lee as the supporting leads. The drama is about regular everyday life, especially finding love while juggling a busy career, and going through and overcoming problems together.

Written and produced from the same team as Sanlih's 2011 to 2012 hit romance drama "Inborn Pair". Filming began on September 16, 2012 and finished on March 3, 2013. It began airing on SETTV ETTV on October 31, 2012 weekly from Monday to Thursday. Each episode has a 45-minute running time. The final episode aired on March 5, 2013 with 72 episodes total, 8 less than the originally intended 80 episodes. This is the first Sanlih drama that has overseas filming.

Synopsis
Yang Yi Ru is a workaholic who never had time to take a break. Her family and friends decided to pull a prank on her to slow her down. They conned her into believing she only had six months to live, then packed her off to a vacation spot to clear her mind. She spent her first day on a sunny beach lamenting to a stranger that she wished she had the time to meet Mr. Right, get married, and have kids. Unbeknownst to her, the stranger was a man from her past who was in love with her when they met years ago. He proposed to her the next day and she married him, but when the prank was revealed, her new husband felt cheated and unleashed his wrath on her.

Plot summary
Lan Shi-de is a tall, handsome and successful young man who manages his family bathroom fixture business, but he is also cold, impatient, and hot-tempered. He hates being deceived, because he was betrayed by former employees in the past, so he always makes sure there is retribution to anyone who crosses him. The only soft spot in his life is his family (which consists of his grandmother, mother, older sister, aunt) and the pretty girl who lent him a pen during his final college exam. He cannot forget the girl that lent him a pen and has been searching for her for 6 years. Not knowing her name or who she is the only memory he has of her: a fuzzy image in a picture he keeps on his desk at home and the pen he never got the chance to return to her.

Yang Yi-ru is a hardworking workaholic who basically runs the entire advertising company she works for, due to her boss and co-workers always depending on her for everything. To make matters worse, her boss is a womanizer who also happens to be her ex-boyfriend, whom her father and younger sister treat like a member of the family. Her boss and family con her into taking an actual vacation, by faking her medical test results to say she has cancer and only six months to live. They pack her off on a trip to sunny Boracay, Philippines, telling her to take some time to relax.

Shi-de also happens to be on a business trip in Boracay, and saves Yi-ru when she is in a daze and almost gets run over by a van. He thanks the heavens for finally being able to meet her again, the girl that lent him a pen all those years ago. Seeing how distressed Yi-ru is, he lets her know that she can confide to him about her problems. She spills out to Shi-de about her regrets on not being able to meet someone she will love, get married, have kids and live a happy old life with her husband. When he hears she only has 6 months left to live, he proposes marriage to her immediately. Yi-ru thinks Shi-de’s proposal is out of kindness to make a dying woman happy. Unbeknownst to her, they had actually met in college and that he has been in love with her all these years. Shi-de decides to put his business trip on hold and stay by Yi-ru’s side. He gives her the most romantic and beautiful wedding reception by the beach. He also tries to fulfill her dying wishes.

Touched by all that her new "pretend" husband has done for her to make her happy, she is overcome with emotion and sleeps with him (losing her virginity in the process), making their marriage feel real. When Yi-ru finds out her illness was a prank by her family and boss she leaves for Taiwan immediately, without saying goodbye to Shi-de. Not wanting to lose her again, Shi-de returns to Taiwan and vows to find her, but when he finds her and finds out her illness was a lie, he feels cheated and unleashes his wrath on Yi-ru, making her life miserable because he thinks she had tricked him into dropping his lawsuit against the company she works for. He gives her the advertising account for his company to use as a way to bully her.

When their misunderstanding is finally cleared up and thinking all is fine now, he tries to pursue her again because he is still madly in love with her. Yi-ru being able to see Shi-de’s vindictive side during his wrath on her wants nothing to do with him after their business relationship ends.  Knowing how he can’t lose her again he tries hard on changing his perspective on people to win her back. Desperate for Yi-ru to accept his love for her he uses their business relationship and signs up for cooking class with her father just to be able to have a chance to see her. He even ask for her boss's help to better understand Yi-ru's personality, but Yi-ru remains unfazed by all that he has done and tells him to stop wasting his time on her. She even rejects his offering to start all over and be friends so that they can get to know each other better.

During a business outing at an orphanage Yi-ru accidentally spies on Shi-de playing with a bunch of kids and finds out that he is a major sponsor at the orphanage. Being able to see a softer and gentler side of him she starts falling for him and accepts his love for her. They get married and go through family and personal issues together, both realizing one must cherish the present.

Cast

Main cast
Annie Chen 陳庭妮 as Yang Yi-ru (楊奕茹) - Age 28 
A workaholic with a hot temper. She doesn't like to be deceived or lied to by others. She manages and runs the entire advertising company Sun Qi-ming owns because her boss is lazy and her co-workers rely on her too much. She meets Lan Shi-de in Boracay and marries him thinking she only has 6 month to live. When she tells Shi-de her illness was a lie, he decides to make her life miserable. Seeing his stern vindictive side, she wants nothing to do with him after their professional business relationship ends. After seeing a softer and gentler side of Shi-de, she falls for him and marries him for real when she almost loses him during an accident.  
George Hu 胡宇威 as Lan Shi-de (藍仕德) - Age 28 
General Manager of his family bathroom fixture business Hao Sheng . Cold and hot tempered, all of his employees are terrified of him. He does not like to be deceived or lied to by others because he was betrayed by his former employees when he took over his family business. He cares deeply of his family and is very protective of them. He has been in love with Yang Yi-ru since meeting her in college and searching for her ever since. For anyone that crosses him he makes sure there is payback, even if it's the girl he loves. After his misunderstanding is cleared with Yi-ru, he tries hard to change his cold-hearted attitude to win her love. He eventually convinces Yi-ru that his love for her is sincere and they get married for real when she thought she had almost lost him during an accident. 
Bobby Dou 竇智孔 as Sun Qi-ming (孫啟鳴) - Age 33
Yang Yi-ru's womanizing boss and ex-boyfriend. Owner of Feng Hua advertising company. He is a lazy slacker who doesn't take work or life seriously. He refers to his multiple girlfriends as goldfishes he raises in a fish bowl. He has a kind personality and is always considerate of others. He thinks of Yi-ru's family as his own due to his lonely childhood upbringing. Discovers he actually does love Yi-ru after Shi-de comes into the picture, but Yi-ru knowing his personality too well rejects his love for her and chooses Shi-de. He comes to accept Yi-ru and Shi-de's relationship and treats both as his own family members. He later finds love with He Cai-rong and marries her.
Harry Chang 張懷秋 as Zheng Yu-xiang (鄭雨翔) - Age 25 
Blames Lan Shi-yun self help love books for the break up of his relationship with his ex-fiancee. Plans a revenge scheme against Shi-yun to make her fall in love with him and then break her heart. He owns a bike messenger mail courier service/cafe shop with his friend. While getting to know Shi-yun during his revenge scheme he eventually falls in love with her for real and finds out his ex-fiancee never really loved him but was using Shi-yun's books as an excuse to end their relationship.  
Vivi Lee 李維維 as Lan Shi-yun (藍仕筠) - Age 32
Lan Shi-de's older sister. She's a famous author of self help love books even though she is 32 years old and last of her friends not to be married. She starts dating Yan Kai but breaks up with him when he tells her he doesn't want to get married. She starts falling for Zheng Yu-xiang later on but is heart broken when she uncovers his scheme to exact revenge on her.

Supporting cast
Esther Yang as Yang Yi-qing (楊奕晴)  - Age 25 
Yang Yi-ru's younger sister. She's a recent college graduate that works as a bicycle messenger mail courier at her former classmate Zheng Yu-xiang shop. Her plan in life is to catch a successful guy which she refers to as fishes. She is immature and nosy. Angus and Guo Zi-yuan both have crushes on her but she dates Angus later on. 
Shen Meng-sheng 沈孟生 as Yang Hao (楊浩) 
Yang Yi-ru and Yang Yi-qing's father. Loves his wife who died of cancer. He has never remarried or doesn't plan too. He teaches cooking classes from his kitchen at home. He treats Sun Qi-ming as a son and originally wanted Yi-ru to choose him, but accepts her decision when she chooses Shi-de. He later supports Qi-ming's relationship with Cai-rong by telling him to get over his doctor phobia. 
 as Lan Yi-ping (藍以蘋) 
Lan Shi-de and Lan Shi-yun's aunt. Works alongside Shi-de at Hao Sheng as the Deputy Manager. Falls in love with Yang Hao after attending one of his cooking classes. Past 40 years old and has never been married. She's a loving aunt to her niece and nephew. She takes a liking to Yi-ru immediately and tries to set her up with Shi-de even before knowing she was his dream girl. She gives advice to Shi-de to make sure he doesn't make a mistake and lose his chance at happiness with Yi-ru. 
 as Lan Ceng Yue-ling (藍曾月鈴) 
Lan Shi-de and Shi-yun's grandmother. She is constantly setting Shi-de up on blind dates because she wants him to get marry as soon as possible so she can have a great grand child. Highly superstitious person who goes by time and date for setting up all important events. She can be unreasonable at times but it's only because she desperately wants great grand children before she gets too old and can't take care of them. 
Yang Chieh-mei as Fang Xiu-qing (方秀琴) 
Lan Shi-de and Lan Shi-yun's mother. Stay at home mom who likes to take care of her whole family. Her husband died 6 years ago in an accident. She is in charge of the cooking and housekeeping in the Lan household. She understands the pressure and unpleasantness Shi-de's goes through when he is set up on blind dates by his grandmother but tends to side with her mother-in-law in order not to offend her. 
Mandy Wei as He Tsai-jung (何采蓉) 
Oncologists doctor (cancer specialist) and star pupil of her class. She was originally enlisted by Shi-de to treat Yi-ru when he thought she had cancer. Lan grandmother tries to set her up with Shi-de after seeing them chat with each other, but because she is a detailed person she knows Shi-de loves Yi-ru and thinks of him as a friend. She falls in love with Sun Qi-ming because of his kindness towards others. She helps Qi-ming reconcile with his mother. Later she and Qi-ming starts dating and gets married at the end.
Kao Cheng-peng 高振鵬 as Uncle Kang (康叔)  
Elderly man who works at Sun Qi-ming's company. Main duties are running menial errands for Qi-ming such as getting lunch, refreshments and cleaning the office. He tends to not understand what is going on in the current situation and ask his co-workers to explain to him what is happening.
Liu Hsiang-chun 劉香君 as Su Mei (素梅) 
A middle-aged lady who works at Feng-Hua. She has 3 children that she needs to support. She heavily relays on Yi-ru for everything at work. Afraid that Yi-ru would leave Feng Hua one day and the company will go out of business.
 as Xiao Wei (小偉)
18-year-old young man but looks 38 years old who works at Feng-Hua. His family back in Hualien County depend on him to send money back to them monthly. He assist Yi-ru on video editing. 
 as Guo Zi-yuan (郭子元)
Zheng Yu-xiang's friend and co owner of their courier/cafe shop. He has a crush on Yi-Qing. He's the only one that knows of Yu-xiang's revenge scheme on Lan Shi-yun. Constantly tells Yu-xiang to give up on his revenge scheme but he's always left at deaf ears.
Huang Chien-hao 黃建豪 as Angus Zhou Jin Chi (周金馳) 
Lan Shi-de's personal assistant at Hao Sheng. He has a crush on Yi-Qing. He's Shi-de's most trusted subordinate at Hao Sheng. 
Albee Liu 劉堇萱 as Albee 
Works at Hao Sheng. Helps Shi-de and Qi-ming to a hotel one night when they are heavily drunk after participating in a beer drinking contest. 
Wu Rui Zhen 吳芮甄 as Wu Xiao Zhen (吳小甄)
Works at Hao Sheng. Forgets to knock at Shi-de's office door while he is degrading Yi-ru and gets scold at by Shi-de. 
Shaun Chen as Yan Kai (嚴凱) 
Lan Shi-yun mistakes him for her blind date. Starts dating Shi-yun for real but has no plans for marriage due to a previous unhappy marriage with his ex-wife. He and Shi-yun breaks up and he transfers to his company Singapore office. Works as a computer tech designer. 
Hong Chenying 洪晨穎 as An Qi (安琪) 
Zheng Yu-Xiang former fiancee. Uses Lan Shi-yun self help love advice books as an excuse to break up with him. She later marries someone else. 
Kelly Ko 柯素雲 as Huang Wenling (黃文玲) 
Sun Qi-ming's mother. Physician running a clinic in a small town. Due to her busy career as a doctor when her son was growing up he thought she did not love him.

Cameos
Verna Lin 林欣蓓 as Samantha (莎曼莎) 
Yi Ru's friend and hotel staff in Boracay. Unfortunately she is the one that breaks the news to Yi-ru about her fake illness and gets beaten up.
Xu Wei-xiao 徐維孝 as Zhao Zi-chen (趙子宸)
Blind date Aunt Yi-ping sets up for Shi-yun but he already has a girlfriend who has a nasty attitude.
Wu Siyu 吳思育 as Professor Ge (葛教授) 
Cai-rong's mentor and former professor at medical school. Works at the same hospital as Cai-rong.
Paul Hsu 許騰方 as Ouyang Rui (歐陽銳) 
Skilled surgeon and Cai-rong's senior. He treats Yi-ru when she is pregnant and ill. Tries to break up Cai-rong and Qi-ming because he likes Cai-rong.
Michael Zhang 張勛傑 as Zai Yu (傅在宇) Note: Micheal Zhang's character from "A Hint Of You".
Chef/owner at a teppanyaki Japanese restaurant. Shi-de's friend who reserves his entire restaurant and make his famous egg fried rice for Yi-ru when a pregnant Yi-ru craves for it. 
Irene 豆豆 as Lan Huan-huan (藍歡歡) 
Shi-de's and Yi-ru's 4 year old daughter. She appears in Shi-de's dreams.

Soundtrack
Go Jogging 一起去跑步 by Cosmic Man 宇宙人
You Want To Be Made Into A Movie 想把你拍成一部電影 by Cosmic Man 宇宙人
Kick Him 踢踢他 by Cosmic Man 宇宙人
Temporary Boyfriend 暫時的男朋友 by Yen-J 嚴爵
I alibi 吾在場證明 by Yen-J 嚴爵
Fueled 火上加油 by Yen-J 嚴爵
Hold Your Hand 執子之手 by Victor 品冠
C.J. 倉頡 by Mayday 五月天
Wild Beast 野獸 by Ding Dang 丁噹 
Marksman 射手 by MP Magic Power MP魔幻力量
After 經過 by Rene 劉若英
Fill in the Blanks 填空 by JiaJia 紀家盈（家家）

Production team

Produced from the same team that produced SETTV 2011 to 2012 hit Taiwan romance drama "Inborn Pair". Hoping to strike double rating success with their "Inborn Pair" leads, Annie Chen and Chris Wang was then split up to film two different new romance dramas to be aired back to back. Annie Chen was paired up with George Hu who was personally invited by Sanlih to film "Love, Now" after spending the past year filming dramas in Mainland China. In an interview with China's LETV he stated that he had agreed to take on the lead role during early development of the project, when the title, story and plot was still not developed yet, in order to re-establish his presence in Taiwan since he had not appeared in a Taiwan television drama for over a year and was afraid Taiwanese audiences would forget him.  While Chris Wang was paired up with Ann Hsu to film "Love Me or Leave Me". Both dramas started filming at the same time.

Producer: 
Fang Xiaoren 方孝仁
Rong Junyi 戎俊義
Screenwriter: 
Shao Huiting 邵慧婷
Lín Pèiyú 林珮瑜
Zheng Yingmin 鄭英敏
Huangxiang Min 黃湘玟
Directed by: Lian Li Chun 連春利
Coordinator: Can Qian Li 李能謙
Sponsor: 
Acer Computer
Derek Bathroom Fixtures
HTC

Filming locations
  
Interiors of the Lan family home, Yang family home, offices of Hao Sheng and Feng Hua are studio built sets at SETTV headquarters.  The exterior of the Lan's bathroom fixture office Hao Sheng is an office tower located at Tiding Boulevard, Zhongshan District of Taipei. The exterior of Feng Hua where Yang Yi-ru worked is an office building located at Tiding Boulevard, Neihu District of Taipei. The exterior and lobby of the Lan family residence was filmed at "Future Hill" residential complex located at Wenhuaer Rd, Linkou District of New Taipei City. The exterior and courtyard of the Yang family residence was filmed at a residential complex located at Yanshou St, Songshan District of Taipei. The residence of Sun Qi-ming is actually the office of an landscaping and interior design company called "Lake Forest Design" located at Kangning Road, Neihu District of Taipei. Other major filming locations include "Min-Sheng General Hospital" where He Cai-rong works as a doctor, "A House" cafe where Zheng Yu-xiang operates his cafe and bike messenger business, "Aqua Kiss 2-Surfer" where the main characters frequented to chat and have a drink, and "Fushin Hotel" room 1108 (where Lan Shi-yun spent her drunken night, Shi-da and Yi-ru had their intimate day, and Sun Qi-ming's pre-wedding prank party was held) . Hsuan Chuang University and Yuen Ze University were used as the school Lan Si-da and Yang Yi-ru attended University, Boracay Philippines scenes were filmed between October 3 till October 13 of 2012. The bathroom scene of Lan Shi-da talking to the toilet bowl and shower kiss scene in episode 3 and 4 was actually filmed at "Fushin Hotel" in Taipei instead of Alta Vista De Boracay.

Taipei, Taiwan
Neihu District
Aqua Kiss 2-Surfer 水吻
Acer HQ Taipei
RT-Mart 大潤發
Nakamura Bakery 中村
White Rock Lake Bridge 白石湖吊橋
Fushin Hotel 台北富信大飯店
Lake Forest Design 大湖森林室內裝修設計工程有限公司 
Zhongzheng District
Cold Stone Creamery 酷聖石冰淇淋
Zhongshan District
We-Go Motel 薇閣精品旅館
Shintori Cuisine Japonaise 新都里懷石料理
Taipei Florist 台北花苑 
Xinyi District
California Pizza Kitchen
Daan District
A House Breakfast & Brunch Restaurant
SILEX BOOKS
pH7 Restaurant
Playboy
Single Noble
L'OCCITANE Café 歐舒丹Café
CHUNG's SILVER WORK STUDIO 玩銀工房
Datong District
Li Ting Xiang Chinese Bakery 李亭香餅舖
Wanhua District
Modern Toilet
Sanzhi District
Suang-Lien Presbyterian Church 雙連安養中心教堂

New Taipei City, Taiwan
Linkou District
Future Hills Luxury Complex 遠雄大未來
Banqiao District
Megacity Mall 板橋大遠百

Taoyuan County, Taiwan
Taoyuan City
Min-Sheng General Hospital 敏盛綜合醫院
Luzhu Township
Decor House
Zhongli City
Yuan Ze University 元智大學

Hsinchu City, Taiwan
Xiangshan District
Hsuan Chuang University 玄奘大學

Boracay, Philippines
Puka Shell Beach
Discovery Shores Boracay
Alta Vista De Boracay
D'Mall
Kalibo Airport

Reception
The pairing of George Hu and Annie Chen was a success. Three month after "Love, Now" finished airing Sanlih decided to pair them up again in 2013's "Love Around" which was aired every Sunday night on Sanlih's other channel TTV.

Broadcast

Episode ratings

Episode description

Awards
2012 Sanlih SETTV Drama Awards - Best Kiss
George Hu & Annie Chen - Winner

References

External links
 SETTV Official website
 ETTV Official website 
 Love, Now Official Facebook page 

Taiwanese drama television series
Sanlih E-Television original programming
2012 Taiwanese television series debuts
2013 Taiwanese television series endings
Taiwanese romance television series